Francisco Ramon Chamorro Piva (born 7 August 1981) is an Argentine professional racing cyclist, who currently rides for Brazilian amateur team Unifunvic Pindamondangadaba. He competed at the 2016 UCI Road World Championships in the road race, but he failed to finish.

Major results

2003
 1st GP São Paulo
2006
 1st Volta Do ABC Paulista
 1st Stage 1b Volta de Goias
 10th Copa América de Ciclismo
2007
 1st Copa da Republica de Ciclismo
 1st GP São Paulo
 Vuelta del Uruguay
1st Stages 1 & 10
 2nd Copa América de Ciclismo
 3rd Prova Ciclística 9 de Julho
2008
 1st Volta Do ABC Paulista
 1st Stage 7 Volta de São Paulo
 2nd Copa América de Ciclismo
2009
 1st Overall 
1st Stages 1 & 2
 1st Copa América de Ciclismo
 1st Copa Hilário Diegues
 1st GP Tiradentes
 Torneio de Verão
1st Stages 1 & 4
 1st Stage 2 Volta Gasol
 3rd Prova Ciclística 9 de Julho
 8th Overall Rutas de América
1st Stages 3 & 5a
2010
 1st Prova Ciclística 1° de Maio
 1st Giro Memorial Atribuna
 1st Prova Ciclística 9 de Julho
 1st Copa da Republica de Ciclismo
 1st Stage 5 Volta de São Paulo
 1st Stage 1 
2011
 1st Prova TV Atalai
 1st GP São Paulo
 1st Copa da Republica de Ciclismo
2012
 1st Copa América de Ciclismo
 Rutas de América
1st Stages 3 & 4a
 Tour do Brasil
1st Stages 1 & 8
2013
 1st Copa América de Ciclismo
2015
 Vuelta del Uruguay
1st Stages 2, 3, 6 & 8
 2nd Copa América de Ciclismo
2017
 1st Stage 3b (TTT) Vuelta del Uruguay
 4th Road race, Pan American Road Championships

References

External links

1981 births
Living people
Argentine male cyclists
Place of birth missing (living people)